Valiyaperunnal (A festival of sacrifice) is a 2019 Indian Malayalam language romantic crime  comedy-drama film, the first film directed by Dimal Dennis. It was scripted jointly by Dennis and Thasreeq Abdul Salam. The film has Shane Nigam in the lead role, along with Himika Bose, Joju George, Soubin Shahir, Vinayakan, Alencier, Captain Raju and Dharmajan Bolgatty in other pivotal roles. The movie was released on 20 December 2019 in India and the countries of the Gulf Cooperation Council.

Cast 

 Shane Nigam as Akkar Salavudheen
 Himika Bose as Pooja
 Joju George as Perumbavoor Shivakumar
 Soubin Shahir as Hanumanth Sheonayi
 Vinayakan as himself (Cameo)
 James Elia as Dysp Chemban Babu
 Atul Kulkarni as Shivaji Rao
 Raza Murad as Khureshi
 Sudheer Karamana as Adv.Koolour
 Anil Nedumangad as George
 Jinu Joseph  as himself (Cameo)
 Nishanth Sagar as Noushad
Alencier as SP Rajmohan IPS
 Captain Raju as Raju Daniel (Voice Dubbed For Kalabhavan Navas) 
 Dharmajan Bolgatty as Atlee
 Aneesh G Menon as Imthiyas
 Abu Salim as DRI Officer, Sherif Khan
 Prem Prakash as Popcorn Basheer
 Sarath Chandran as Muneer
 Hafiz Abdul Jaleel as Koya Saahib
 asha Madathil Sreekanth as Beevi

Production 
Valiya Perunnal was produced by Monisha Rajeev and co-produced by Shohaib Khan Hanif Rawther. Siju S Bava was the creative director. Vivek Harshan was the editor and Suresh Rajan was DOP. The movie's audiography was done by Sreejesh Nair and the sound design by Anish P Tom. Jayakrishnan was the production designer. Rex Vijayan composed the music for this movie. The trailer for the film was released on 14 December 2019.

Soundtrack 
The music was produced by Rex Vijayan. The soundtrack album consists of nine songs. It features remix versions of three old songs: "Kochi-Mattancheri", "Piraanth" and "Vandu Njan". "Labbaikkallah" was a poem by the late KV Aboobacker Master. The title song, "Hey", was composed by Saju Sreenivas and produced and arranged by Rex Vijayan. The song "Uyirullavaram" was co-produced by the Malayalam hip-hop band Street Academics.

References

External links 

2010s Malayalam-language films
2019 films
2019 romantic comedy-drama films
Indian romantic comedy-drama films
Films scored by Rex Vijayan
2019 comedy films
2019 drama films
Romantic crime films